Dascyllus strasburgi, Strasburg's dascyllus,  is a species of ray-finned fish from the family Pomacentridae, the clownfishes and damselfishes. It is endemic to the Marquesas Islands where they are found among coral and rocky reefs. and feed on zooplankton. The specific name honours Donald W. Strasburg of the University of Hawaii, a fish ecologist and collector of the type specimen.

References

straburgi
Taxa named by Wolfgang Klausewitz
Fish described in 1960